David Stanley Harris (July 14, 1900 – September 18, 1973) was a professional baseball player who played outfielder in the Major Leagues from  to . He played for the Boston Braves, Chicago White Sox, and Washington Senators.

On August 5, 1932 Harris broke up a potential perfect game by Tommy Bridges, of the Detroit Tigers, as the 27th batter. The pitcher was due up to bat before Washington Senators manager Walter Johnson sent Harris in to pinch hit. Harris singled off of Bridges. Harris ended up leading the American League with fourteen pinch hits. 1932 was also the year in which Harris finished 19th in the MVP voting.

In 542 games over seven seasons, Harris hit .281 (406-for-1447) with 243 runs scored, 74 doubles, 33 triples, 32 home runs, 247 RBI, 196 walks, an on-base percentage of .368 and a slugging percentage of .444. He compiled a career .963 fielding percentage.

External links

1900 births
1973 deaths
Major League Baseball outfielders
Baseball players from North Carolina
Boston Braves players
Chicago White Sox players
Washington Senators (1901–1960) players
People from Summerfield, North Carolina